Oregon Route 218 (OR 218) is an Oregon state highway that runs between the small towns of Shaniko and Fossil in north-central Oregon and is known as the Shaniko-Fossil Highway No. 291 (see Oregon highways and routes).  OR 218 is a part of the Journey Through Time Scenic Byway, an Oregon state byway.

Route description

OR 218 is a fairly short rural highway. Its western terminus is in Wasco County, in the ghost town of Shaniko at U.S. Route 97. The road is very windy and hilly over its entire  length and is a popular destination for motorcyclists. It runs through the small town of Antelope (population 50) and has a junction with OR 293 on the south end of town.

More mountainous terrain follows, and the highway crosses the John Day River into Wheeler County at Clarno. Just east of Clarno is the Clarno Unit of the John Day Fossil Beds National Monument. The eastern terminus is in Fossil at the junction of Washington Street and Seventh Street (OR 19).

Major junctions

References

External links

Bridgehunter.com - Clarno Bridge (1908–1975)
Bridgehunder.com - Clarno Bridge (1975–)
Motorcycle Roads NorthWest - Oregon State Route 218 'Shaniko-Fossil Highway'

218
Transportation in Wasco County, Oregon
Transportation in Wheeler County, Oregon
John Day Fossil Beds National Monument